Operation Gown (Ketonet), was a military operation conducted deep inside Syria by Sayeret Tzanhanim, the reconnaissance platoon of the Israeli Defense Forces' Paratroopers Brigade. It took place on October 12, 1973, during the Yom Kippur War. The paratroopers destroyed a bridge in the tri-border area of Iraq, Syria and Jordan, thereby disrupting the transfer of weapons and military forces between Syria and its allies.

External links

 My war- Maj. Gen. (Res.) Shaul Mofaz: 300 miles deep inside Syria on nrg
 Zvi Sever, and others, Paratroopers' Regiment: Thirty Years of Yom Kippur War Operations, Tel Aviv, 2005, in The Yom Kippur War Center website (Hebrew)

Battles of the Yom Kippur War
October 1973 events in Asia